Gökçeada Airport  is a public airport in Gökçeada,  a town in Çanakkale Province, Turkey.

Statistics

External links
 https://web.archive.org/web/20111006194142/http://www.airporthaber.com/readnews.php?newid=32314
 https://web.archive.org/web/20111006194214/http://www.airporthaber.com/readnews.php?newid=32111
 https://web.archive.org/web/20110717005841/http://www.airporthaber.com/gokceada-yolcu-ucagiyla-tanisti-foto-haber--33707h.html
 http://www.flyseabird.com/en-US/our-destinations/destinations/
 http://web.shgm.gov.tr/kurumsal.php?page=haberler&id=1&haber_id=2667

References

Airports in Turkey
Buildings and structures in Çanakkale Province
Imbros